Pantaloon (from Italian Pantalone), is a traditional greedy merchant character in 16th-century Italian Commedia dell'arte.

Pantaloon or Pantaloons may also refer to:

Theatre
Pantaloon, a character in the Harlequinade
 Pantaloons, a style of trousers originally modelled after the Pantaloon character
 Pantaloons, modern baggy trousers
The Pantaloons, a British touring theatre company
The pantaloon, sixth character in the Seven Ages of Man speech from Shakespeare's As You Like It Act II Scene VII. "All the world's a stage..."
The Pantaloon, penultimate painting from Smirke's The Seven Ages of Man (painting series)

Other
 "The Pantaloon", a song by Twenty One Pilots from Twenty One Pilots (album).
HMS Pantaloon, two ships of the Royal Navy
Pantaloons Retail, a large retailer in India, now renamed

See also
Pantalon, a musical instrument
Pantalone, a character in the Italian commedia dell'arte
Pantaloon hernia, the coexistence of direct and indirect hernias descending either side of the epigastric artery